Sadashiv Ganpatrao "Sadu" Shinde  (18 August 1923 – 22 June 1955) was an Indian cricketer who played in seven Test matches from 1946 to 1952. His daughter, Pratibha Pawar, is the wife of politician Sharad Pawar.

A leg-spinner, Shinde was described as "frail and willowy". Apart from the leg break and the conventional googly, Shinde could also bowl a different googly. According to Sujit Mukherjee, "coming after the orthodox wrist-crooked wrong-'un, this delivery invariably sprang a nasty surprise. Ripped off the top of the third finger, it hastened unexpectedly off the pitch. Its tendency to pitch short nullified its efficacy as secret weapon but was practically unplayable when properly pitched."

Shinde's first performance of note in first class cricket was a 5 for 186 that took in 75.5 overs for Maharashtra against Bombay in 1943-44 as Vijay Merchant made 359* for Bombay. He toured England with the Indian team in 1946 and took 39 wickets in tour matches. In his only appearance in a Test match, at Lord's, he was involved in a stand of 43 for the last wicket with Rusi Modi, but did little with the ball. In the next five years, he played in only one more Test.

His one major success in Tests came against England at Delhi in 1951–52. He was brought on to bowl as the third change just before lunch on the first day of the series. Immediately after lunch he bowled Don Kenyon middle stump with a googly, and followed with Jack Robertson lbw and Donald Carr caught by wicket-keeper Nana Joshi off a leg-break. He was 8-2-16-3 at this point. He took three more wickets after tea as England were bowled out for 203 five minutes before close. Shinde's figures were 6/91. India took a handsome first innings lead and had two days to bowl England out in the second innings. But Shinde had seven chances missed off his bowling, most crucially by Joshi and the substitute Dattajirao Gaekwad, and England managed to save the match. Shinde himself missed a run out.

Shinde found a place in the team to England in 1952 (possibly at the expense of Subhash Gupte). He took 39 more wickets in tour matches but the wicket of Peter May in Leeds was to be his last in Tests.

Given a minimum of ten innings, Shinde is one of only two Test cricketers whose batting averages exceeded their highest score.  The other was the Pakistani cricketer, Antao D'Souza.

Shinde represented Maharashtra, Bombay and Baroda in Ranji Trophy and took 230 wickets in first class matches. He died of typhoid at the age of 32. Shinde is the father-in-law of Sharad Pawar, the former President of BCCI.

References

External links

1923 births
1955 deaths
Cricketers from Mumbai
India Test cricketers
Indian cricketers
Maharashtra cricketers
Hindus cricketers
Baroda cricketers
Mumbai cricketers
South Zone cricketers
West Zone cricketers
Deaths from typhoid fever